Gorigandi is a village in Chikkamagaluru district, Karnataka, India.

References

Villages in Chikkamagaluru district